Sieges Even was a German progressive metal band from Munich. The band was originally formed under the name 'Sodom' (not to be confused with fellow German band Sodom) in the early 1980s, released their first demo in 1983, and adopted the name Sieges Even in 1985. They recorded a series of demos, before securing a recording contract with Steamhammer Records in 1988.  Their debut album, Life Cycle (1988), employed rapid time changes, which fragmented the songs, and although the album was well received in Germany, it had few buyers elsewhere.  Sieges Even played mostly in the progressive metal genre, but experimented with different musical styles over the years.

In mid 2008, the band split up due to internal differences. Markus Steffen and Arno Menses formed the band Subsignal, while the Holzwarth brothers have been participating in various projects. Since 2011, they are both full members of Rhapsody of Fire.

Discography

Demos 
 Demo (1983 as Sodom)
 Demo '86 (1986)
 Demo '87 (1987)
 Repression and Resistance (1988)
 What's Progressive? (1994)
 Equinox (2000 as Looking-Glass-Self)
 Footprints of Angels (2003 as Val'Paraiso)

Albums 
 Life Cycle (1988)
 Steps (1990)
 A Sense of Change (1991)
 Sophisticated (1995)
 Uneven (1997)
 The Art of Navigating by the Stars (2005)
 Paramount (2007)
 Playgrounds (live album, 2008)

Personnel

Last members
 Arno Menses − lead vocals (The Art of Navigating by the Stars, Paramount, Playgrounds)
 Markus Steffen − guitar (all albums except Sophisticated, Uneven)
 Oliver Holzwarth − bass guitar
 Alex Holzwarth − drums

Past members
 Franz Herde – lead vocals (Life Cycle, Steps)
 Jogi Kaiser – lead vocals (A Sense of Change)
 Wolfgang Zenk – guitar (Sophisticated, Uneven)
 Greg Keller – lead vocals (Sophisticated, Uneven)
 Börk Keller − keyboards (Uneven)
 Markus Burchert – guitar
 Andre Matos – lead vocals

Timeline

References

External links
 Sieges Even at the BNR Metal Pages
 Sieges Even at MySpace
 

German progressive metal musical groups
Musical groups established in 1985
Musical groups disestablished in 1997
Musical groups established in 2004
Musical groups disestablished in 2008
1985 establishments in West Germany